Chain Gang of Love is debut studio album by the Danish rock duo, The Raveonettes.  The album was released in 2003 by Sony Records and was co-produced by Richard Gottehrer, who had previously worked on hit albums by Blondie, the Go-Go's and Richard Hell & the Voidoids. All of the songs, but two, are under 3 minutes long and are written in the key of B flat major; a concept similar to their previous record, Whip It On, whose tracks had a similar length and were written in the key of B flat minor.

The album peaked at #123 in the U.S. charts and at #43 in the UK.

"That Great Love Sound" was featured on the soundtrack of FIFA 2004

Reception

Chain Gang of Love received generally positive reviews upon its release. At Metacritic, which assigns a normalised rating out of 100 to reviews from mainstream critics, the album received an average score of 77, based on 21 reviews, which indicates "Generally favorable reviews".

Track listing

References 

2003 debut albums
The Raveonettes albums
Albums produced by Richard Gottehrer
Columbia Records albums
European Border Breakers Award-winning albums

pt:Chain Gang Of Love